"Sunrise" is a song recorded by South Korean girl group GFriend for their second studio album Time for Us (2019). It was also released as the group's third Japanese single and was later included in their debut Japanese studio album Fallin' Light (2019).

Composition 
The song was written by Noh Joo-hwan who also produced the song alongside Lee Won-jong.

Release 
Two teasers were released on January 5, 2019 and January 12, 2019, respectively.

The song was released on January 14, 2019, in conjunction with their second studio album.

Japanese version 
In Japan, the song was released as their second single on February 13, 2019. It was released as a digital EP and in three physical editions: CD, CD+DVD Type A and CD+Photobook Type B.

Commercial performance 
"Sunrise" debuted and peaked at number 12 on the Gaon Digital Chart for the week ending January 19, 2019. The song topped the componing Download Chart and placed at number 26 on the componing Streaming Chart, peaking at 17 the following week.

The song placed at number 9 for the month of January 2019. The song also placed at 31 in February 2019. at number 94 in March 2019. It also charted at number 145 for 2019.

Japan 
The single debuted and peaked at number 11 on the Oricon Singles Chart for the week ending February 25, 2019.

Track listing

Accolades

Charts

Weekly charts

Year-end charts

See also 
 List of M Countdown Chart winners (2019)

References 

2019 songs
2019 singles
GFriend songs
Korean-language songs
Kakao M singles
Hybe Corporation singles